In September 2021, an average of 47,916 people slept in New York City's homeless shelters each night. This included 18,236 single adults, 14,946 children, and 14,734 adults in families. The total number peaked in November 2018, with 63,636 people sleeping in homeless shelters. Since March 2020, the number of people sleeping in shelters has declined significantly, likely an effect of the COVID-19 pandemic. The city reported that in 2019, 3,600 individuals experienced unsheltered homelessness (sleeping in public spaces such as streets and public transit rather than shelters).

The Coalition for the Homeless, a New York-based non-profit organization, reports that 30% of single adults entering the shelter system each year enter directly from institutional settings. In 2018 6,100 adults entered from institutional settings, including: 3,466 from prison, 1,294 from non-hospital facilities (i.e. nursing homes), 760 from psychiatric hospitals, and 580 discharged from Rikers Island. In 2019, 59% of Single Adults in shelters were Black, 27% were Hispanic, 10% were White (non-Hispanic), 4% Unknown/other, and 0.4% Asian/Pacific Islander. Black people are disproportionately homeless, making up only 29% of NYC residents (35% difference). Whites are underrepresented, making up 32% of NYC residents (22% difference).

History
In 1979, a New York City lawyer, Robert Hayes, brought a class action suit before the courts, Callahan v. Carey, against the City and State, arguing for a person's state constitutional "right to shelter". It was settled as a consent decree in August 1981. The City and State agreed to provide board and shelter to all homeless men who met the need standard for welfare or who were homeless by certain other standards. By 1983 this right was extended to homeless women.

On March 18, 2013, the New York City Department of Homeless Services reported that the sheltered homeless population consisted of:
 27,844 adults
 20,627 children
 48,471 total individuals

According to the Coalition for the Homeless, the homeless population of New York rose to an all-time high in 2011. A reported 113,552 people slept in the city's emergency shelters last year, including over 40,000 children; marking an 8 percent increase from the previous year and a 37 percent increase from 2002. There was also a rise in the number of families relying on shelters, approximately 29,000. That is an increase of 80% from 2002. About half of the people who slept in shelter in 2010 returned for housing in 2011.

In 2004, New York's Department of Homeless Services (DHS) created HomeBase, a network of neighborhood-based services, to help tenants in housing crisis to remain in their communities and avoid entering shelter. Tenants can visit HomeBase locations within their neighborhoods to receive services to prevent eviction, assistance obtaining public benefits, emergency rental assistance and more. Brooklyn nonprofit CAMBA, Inc operates several HomeBase locations as well as an outfitted "You Can Van," which uses data on pending evictions to travel throughout the borough and offer help.

According to DHS, 64 percent of those applying for emergency shelter in 2010 were denied. Several were denied because they were said to have family who could house them when in actuality this might not have been the case. Applicants may have faced overcrowding, unsafe conditions, or may have had relatives unwilling to house them. According to Mary Brosnaham, spokeswoman for Coalition for the Homeless, the administration of Mayor Michael Bloomberg employs a deliberate policy of "active deterrence".

According to the Bowery Mission, "In most cases, multiple factors are involved [in homelessness]. Common ones include: mental illness, substance abuse, untreated medical issues, traumatic events, violence and abuse, lack of affordable housing and difficulty sustaining employment."

The New York City Housing Authority is experiencing record demand for subsidized housing assistance. However, just 13,000 of the 29,000 families who applied were admitted into the public housing system or received federal housing vouchers known as Section 8 in 2010. Due to budget cuts there have been no new applicants accepted to receive Section 8.

In March 2010, there were protests about the Governor's proposed cut of $65 million in annual funding to the homeless adult services system. The Bloomberg administration announced an immediate halt to the Advantage program, threatening to cast 15,000 families back into the shelters or onto the streets. A court has delayed the cut until May 2011 because there was doubt over the legality of cancelling the city's commitment. However, the Advantage program itself was consciously advanced by the Bloomberg administration as an alternative to providing long-term affordable housing opportunities for the poor and working class. The result, as the Coalition for the Homeless report points out, is that "Thousands of formerly-homeless children and families have been forced back into homelessness, In addition, Mayor Bloomberg proposed $37 million in cuts to the city's budget for homeless services this year."

In 2018, DHS's budget was $2.15 billion. It fluctuated over the next few years, with 2021's proposed budget being slightly lower at $2.13 billion.

Homeless encampments have long featured prominently in the landscape of American cities.  A vicious anti-homeless campaign called 'Peek-A-Boo, We See You Too' led by a union of NYPD officers sparked an uproar about the presence of homeless people more generally.  Urban financialization in particular has focused on the city's stock of low-income rent stabilized housing.  The warehousing of vacant buildings by speculators led to an increase in homeless encampments.

HOME-STAT 
In 2015, Bill deBlasio introduced HOME-STAT (Homeless Outreach & Mobile Engagement Street Action Teams). HOME-STAT is a city-wide case management system which compiles information on unsheltered homelessness from 311 calls and street canvassing teams. Outreach teams include staff from different agencies including the Department of Homeless Services, the NYPD, and other social service agencies. The core tenants of HOME-STAT are: proactive canvassing from Canal Street to 145th Street to identify "hotspots of persistent homelessness presence," immediate response to 311 calls by expanding the number of city street outreach staff and NYPD officers assigned to the Homeless Outreach Unit, and the creation of a city-wide case management system that facilitates "continuous monitoring and outreach" and "rapid response to individual problems." Under HOME-STAT, the city has created a by-name list of individuals known to outreach teams, confirmed to be experiencing homelessness, and currently engaged by outreach teams.

The city encourages New Yorkers to call 311 when they see individuals, they believe to be homeless, and call 911 if the individual seems to be a risk to themselves or others. This relies on the individual perceptions of New Yorkers on who they assume to be homeless and creates a division between New Yorkers with reliable shelter and those without, encouraging people to use the city as an intermediary. The city labels homeless individuals who avoid the city's shelters as "service resistant". In 2019, Coalition for the Homeless reported that the city's shelters struggle with 3 main issues including: "large-scale capital needs, routine cleaning and maintenance, and dehumanizing treatment by shelter staff." Coalition for the Homeless explains that these conditions create an unsafe, degrading and dehumanizing environment for those who stay in shelters.

Crimes relating to begging in New York

The administration of laws and regulations relating to begging in the state of New York is largely performed by each of the 62 cities of the state. Many of the state of New York's largest cities have introduced laws in the last decade prohibiting 'aggressive begging' in some form.  The 1993 Loper case was a challenge to the state-wide law in the New York Penal Code §240.35(1) which made it an offence to loiter in a public place for the purpose of begging. New York City Police Department rarely issued fines under this law, but used it to 'move on' beggars. In Loper, the Second Circuit Court of Appeals found begging in this case to be a First Amendment right, but still legal to ban in subways. A similar judgement was made in International Society for Krishna Consciousness, Inc. v. Lee in regard to New York City's airports, which found it reasonable to ban such activities in airports.  However, the law still technically remained in force in the rest of New York state until it was repealed in 2010. This caused some people in New York state to be charged under that section of the law after Loper, but before it was repealed. Civil liberties groups have campaigned against the more targeted aggressive begging laws, however, they have been found to comply with the First Amendment. In 2010, New York City's current aggressive begging laws also withstood challenge in People v. Stroman.

References

Housing in New York (state)
New York (state)